Raipur, located in the Sardulgarh tehsil of Mansa district in Punjab, India, is an old and noted village of the area. The famous Babbar martyr Bhai Gurmel Singh from the village was martyred during an operation in Maujia on 8 September 1991.

Geography

It is located in the development block of Jhunir in Mansa district of Indian Punjab. The city of Mansa lies to its northeast (21 km), the city and district of Bathinda to its northwest, Sardulgarh to its south (32 km) and the state capital city of Chandigarh to its far northeast (203 km). The historical city of Talwandi Sabo is just 21 km away in the northwest. It is linked directly to the 11 surrounding villages, Baje Wala, Bire Wala Jattan, Jherian Wali (Bishanpura), Tandian, Nangla, Peron, Behniwal, Bana Wala, Talwandi Aklia (Chhoti Talwandi), Makha and Chhapian Wali.

Demographics
As of the 2001 census, the village had a total population of 5,530 with 940 households, 2,940 males and 2,590 females. Thus, males constitute 53% and females 47% of the total population with a sex ratio of 880 females per thousand males.

Culture 

Punjabi is the mother tongue as well as the official language of the village, predominated by the Jatt people of Sidhu clan. There is an old well which was used in the past for drinking water but it has long been unused and is near-ruined.

Religion 

The village is predominantly Sikh, with Hindu and Muslim minorities.

The Gurudwara Sahib is the main religious site for all. There are three Deras, following the Sikh faith, in the memory of/founded by the respected Sants, known as Wadda Dera, Tahli Wala Dera and Dera Baba Preet. The village, further, has a lali Mandir now known as Durga Mandir, located near the water works as the worship site for Hindus. There is a burial place for the Muslim families.

Climate

The western Himalayas in the north, Thar Desert in the southwest and monsoons mainly determine the climate. Monsoons greatly affect the agriculture in the region as nearly 70% of the rain falls between July and September.

Education 

The village has good educational options, having a pioneer Institution of Secondary education Adarsh Public Senior Secondary School, government primary school, and a government senior secondary school.

Economy 

The village has a branch of the State Bank of India located near the government primary school.

Agriculture 
As is common in the region, agriculture is the main occupation as well as the main source of income for all Jatts. There is a very good irrigation water supply from the canal and when the canal dries up, people used to run their tube wells as a backup. Wheat, mustard and cotton are the main crops in the area.

Other 

In the minorities, Hindus, have their shops, general and medical stores etc. Others do labour in the fields or are employed by the newly constructed 2700 megawatt-capacity Talwandi Sabo Power Plant on the outskirts of the village.

Infrastructure 

The village has a power grid, water works and reverse osmosis plant for filtered water service and an animal dispensary.

Problems 

Education

There is a lack of teachers to teach over 800 students in the government schools.

Drainage

The village's  (English: surrounding road) faces drainage problems as it is at a lower level than the houses, so it is flooded daily by waste and rainwater. Students also face problems going to school as near the schools the problem is at its worst. All of the village roads leading to Mansa and Talwandi Sabo have been flooded.

See also 
Akkan Wali
Chachohar
Khiali Chehlan Wali
Kila Raipur
Lakhmir Wala
Ullak

Gallery

References

Villages in Mansa district, India
Villages surrounding Talwandi Sabo Power Plant